Stereum rameale is a plant pathogen infecting peach trees. It is often found in tiers on the dead wood of broad-leaved trees.

Description
The species is thin, elastic and tough when moist, hard and brittle when dry. No distinctive odour or taste. No change in flesh colour when cut.And otherwise know as Crowded Parchment as per the National Audubon Society(cite?) . It is inedible.

References

External links
 Index Fungorum
 USDA ARS Fungal Database

Fungal tree pathogens and diseases
Stone fruit tree diseases
Fungi of Europe
Stereaceae
Fungi described in 1801
Inedible fungi